Gyldenstolpe's worm skink, Gyldenstolpe's isopachys, or Gyldenstolpe's snake skink (Isopachys gyldenstolpei) is a species of skink, a lizard in the family Scincidae. The species is endemic to Thailand.

Etymology
The specific name, gyldenstolpei, is in honor of Swedish ornithologist Nils Gyldenstolpe.

Geographic range
I. gyldenstolpei is found only in Thailand.

Description
The species is limbless.

Reproduction
I. gyldenstolpei is viviparous.

References

Further reading
Lönnberg E (1916). "Zoological Results of the Swedish Zoological Expedition to Siam 1911-1912 and 1914: 2. Lizards". Kungliga Svenska Vetenskapsakademiens Handlingar 55 (4): 1–12. (Isopachys gyldenstolpei, new species, pp. 10–12 + Figures 2–6).
Smith MA (1935). The Fauna of British India, Including Ceylon and Burma. Reptilia and Amphibia. Vol. II.—Sauria. London: Secretary of State for India in Council. (Taylor and Francis, printers). xiii + 440 pp. + Plate I + 2 maps. (Ophioscincus gyldenstolpei, pp. 335–336, Figure 75).
Taylor EH (1963). "The Lizards of Thailand". Univ. Kansas Sci. Bull. 44: 687–1077. (Isopachys gyldenstolpei, p. 1061).

Isopachys
Reptiles of Thailand
Endemic fauna of Thailand
Reptiles described in 1916
Taxonomy articles created by Polbot
Taxa named by Einar Lönnberg